Bellou-le-Trichard is a commune in the Orne department in northwestern France.

Population

See also
Communes of the Orne department

References

External links

Official site

Communes of Orne